Maria Elena or María Elena is the name of:

People
María Elena Barrera, Mexican politician
Maria Elena Boschi, Italian politician
María Elena Calle, Ecuadorian marathon runner
Maria Elena Camerin, Italian tennis player
María Elena Chapa, Mexican politician
María Elena Durazo, American politician
María Elena Espeso, Spanish marathon runner
María Elena Giusti, Venezuelan synchronised swimmer
María Elena González, American artist
María Elena Holly, widow of Buddy Holly
Maria Elena Kyriakou, Cypriot singer
María Elena Marqués, Mexican actress and singer
María Elena Moyano, Peruvian activist
María Elena Orantes López, Mexican politician
María Elena Ramírez, Mexican gymnast
María Elena Salinas, American journalist
María Elena Sarría, Cuban athlete
María Elena Swett, Chilean actress
María Elena Velasco, Mexican actress, singer, and director
María Elena Walsh, Argentine author and songwriter

Geography
María Elena, Chile, town in Chile
María Elena Solar Power Plant
María Elena Airport, former airstrip

Other
"María Elena" (song), a Spanish-language song
María Elena (film), a 1936 Mexican film
Maria Elena (character), in Vicky Cristina Barcelona